Sudheer Anand Bayana, professionally known as Sudigali Sudheer, is an Indian actor, comedian, and television presenter who works in Telugu films and television. He has appeared in  TV shows Jabardasth, Extra Jabardasth, Pove Pora and Dhee Ultimate Dance Show. He has secured 13th place in Hyderabad Times Most Desirable Men on TV – for the year 2018.

Early life and family 
Sudheer Anand Bayana was born in Vijayawada, Krishna District, Andhra Pradesh to Dev Anand Bayana and Nagarani Bayana into a Telugu-speaking family. He studied in Sri Telaprolu Bappanaiah School.

Filmography

Film

Television

References

External links 

Living people
Indian male film actors
1987 births
Male actors in Telugu cinema
Male actors in Telugu television
21st-century Indian male actors
Male actors from Vijayawada
Indian male television actors
People from Vijayawada
People from Krishna district
Indian television actors
Telugu comedians
Indian male comedians
Indian magicians